Phillip Richardson (born 29 January 1949) is a Trinidadian former cyclist. He competed in the team pursuit at the 1968 Summer Olympics.

References

External links
 

1949 births
Living people
Trinidad and Tobago male cyclists
Olympic cyclists of Trinidad and Tobago
Cyclists at the 1968 Summer Olympics
20th-century Trinidad and Tobago people